"Earned It", alternatively titled "Earned It (Fifty Shades of Grey)", is a song by Canadian singer the Weeknd. The song was released as the lead single from the soundtrack to the 2015 film Fifty Shades of Grey and was included on the Weeknd's second studio album Beauty Behind the Madness (2015).

"Earned It" was lauded by critics upon release, and peaked at number three on the Billboard Hot 100, becoming the Weeknd's first top five single. The song's popularity made Fifty Shades of Grey the latest soundtrack to generate concurrent top-ten singles with Ellie Goulding's "Love Me like You Do", which also peaked at number three. Its music video was directed by the film's director, Sam Taylor-Johnson, features the film's lead actress, Dakota Johnson, and has the same BDSM theme. The song was nominated for Best Original Song at the 88th Academy Awards and won the Grammy Award for Best R&B Performance at the 58th Annual Grammy Awards.

Background
The Weeknd was involved in the project very early on. Tom Mackay, a manager at Republic Records, explained: "He worked on a number of songs for a number of scenes. Some were working and some weren't, but he just kept at it, and kept at it, and kept at it. In the end, he wrote 'Earned It' and it's the biggest song of his career to date. It's the only song that's in the movie twice". Director Sam Taylor-Johnson said the Weeknd's voice is instantly seductive, which fit the film perfectly. The singer agreed saying the film and his music is like "a match made in heaven". An alternative version of the single, with a new slightly long intro, was later included in the Weeknd's album Beauty Behind the Madness (2015).

Composition
"Earned It" is a chamber pop and R&B song. It is written in the key of D minor with a slow tempo of 40 beats per minute (Largo) in  time.  There is an alternation between the chords Gm and Dm, and Tesfaye's vocals span two octaves from D3 to D5.

Critical reception
Unlike the film, "Earned It" received critical acclaim. Rolling Stone ranked the song at number 39 on its year-end list to find the 50 best songs of 2015; the Weeknd appears an additional two times on this list with his following singles, "The Hills" and "Can't Feel My Face".

Accolades
The song won the Grammy Award for Best R&B Performance at the 58th Annual Grammy Awards, while also being nominated for Best R&B Song, and Best Song Written for Visual Media. The song also received a nomination for Best Original Song at the 88th Academy Awards.

Chart performance
In the Weeknd's native Canada, "Earned It" peaked at number eight on the Canadian Hot 100. "Earned It" peaked at number three on the Billboard Hot 100, the second single from the Fifty Shades of Grey soundtrack to enter the top 10, after Ellie Gouldings "Love Me like You Do", which also peaked at number three. It became the Weeknd's second top-ten hit, after his collaboration with Ariana Grande on the number seven peaking hit, "Love Me Harder" and his highest-selling song on the chart at the time. The song has also been a commercial success overseas, reaching the top ten in 10 other countries, including the United Kingdom and New Zealand, while attaining a top twenty position in countries that include Australia, Germany, and Ireland.

Music video
The music video, directed by the film's director Sam Taylor-Johnson, was shot at the Palace Theater in Los Angeles. It was released on Vevo and YouTube on January 21, 2015. It includes the BDSM theme as seen in the film. The video shows The Weeknd performing on stage as a group of topless women with black tape over their breasts perform a BDSM-themed burlesque routine behind him. Dakota Johnson makes a cameo appearance in the video.

Track listing
 Republic – 06025 4730000 3

Charts

Weekly charts

Year-end charts

Decade-end charts

Certifications

Release history

References

2014 singles
2014 songs
The Weeknd songs
Republic Records singles
Pop ballads
Contemporary R&B ballads
Songs written by Belly (rapper)
Songs written by Stephan Moccio
Songs written by the Weeknd
Fifty Shades film music
Songs written by DaHeala
2010s ballads
Chamber pop songs
Songs about BDSM